Sedley Place is a British design agency based in Clapham, London and employees 35 designers, graphic artists, architects, web designers and account teams.

History
The four founding partners all met at Wolff Olins: Gerry Barney, David Bristow, Kit Cooper, Terence Griffin and set up the company in 1978. All but Barney retired from the business in 1996 after Mick Nash took over as managing director. The company operated an office in Berlin from 1987 to 2004.

Barney started his career at the Design Research Unit designing logos like the iconic British Rail logo

The agency originally started as a graphic design agency yet evolved and increased its disciplines as client demands grew. This has been central to the agency's growth and it now covers typography, architecture, interior design, corporate branding, packaging, 3D graphics and web design.

The agency took its name from the address of its original offices situated on Sedley Place adjacent to Oxford Street and Woodstock Street in London. This street was named after Orlando Sedley, an 18th-century furniture maker who had his workshops located there. The agency relocated to its current offices in 1985 on Venn St, Clapham.

Key projects
 The Coca-Cola Piccadilly Circus sign as it appears today was designed and project managed by Sedley Placed in 2003, originally the world's widest curved LED screen. They are now retained by Coca-Cola produce all content for the sign. Sedley Place also designed the very first LED sign at Piccadilly Circus for Coca-Cola replacing their previous neon sign.
 Sedley Place has worked with Diageo for over twenty years developing brands including Johnnie Walker (Blue, Gold, Green and Black labels), Cardhu, Talisker, Tanqueray
 VAG Rounded Typeface was created by Gerry Barney as part of a rebranding project for VW dealerships. This font, now in the public domain is widely used and features on all Apple laptop and computer keyboards.
 From a simple verbal brief to create a spinning bottle for the Asian market the unique Revolve Bottle  was created for Chivas Brothers
 Working with Michael Wolff (of Wolff Olins) Barney penned the now well known Hed Kandi record label logo

Clients

Aspria
Audi
Bar Coda
Blackwood Distilleries Ltd.
Coca-Cola
Cumbria Tourism
Diageo
 DLB
Hope & Greenwood
Inn on the Lake
IMTV
LeisureCorp
Leo Burnett
 Lowe Group
Luxe Interior

McDonald's
McKinney Rogers
Moorfield (Accor/Mercure Hotels)
Nina Campbell Ltd.
Royal Mail
The Gleneagles Hotel
The World ResidenSea
Hine Cognac Thomas Hine & Co.
TBWA
Tom Jago
John Vincent Power
Volkswagen
William Grant & Sons

Former employees
Sedley Place has employed a number of notable British designers:

Thomas Manss
Michael Johnson
Petra Weisz
Adrian Burton
Paul McPherson

References

External links
 Sedley Place

Design companies of the United Kingdom